Joann Ginal is an American politician who serves in the Colorado Senate from the 14th district since 2019, as a member of the Democratic Party. Before her tenure in the state senate she served in the Colorado House of Representatives from the 52nd district from 2013 to 2019.

Ginal was born in Manchester, New Hampshire, and also lived in Florida and Massachusetts. She graduated from the University of New Hampshire, Iowa State University, and Colorado State University during which she moved to Fort Collins, Colorado. In 2012, she was elected to the state house to succeed John Kefalas, who had run for a seat in the state senate, and served until she was selected to replace Kefalas in the state senate in 2018.

Early life and education

Joann Ginal was born in Manchester, New Hampshire. She lived in Florida and Massachusetts before moving to Fort Collins, Colorado, to continue her college education in 1990. She graduated from the University of New Hampshire with a  Bachelor of Science in biology, Iowa State University with a Master of Science in zoology and parasitology, and Colorado State University with a PhD in reproductive endocrinology. Ginal received a honored certification from the Harvard Kennedy School. She planned to marry her partner after the legalization of same-sex civil unions in Colorado.

State legislature

Elections

In 2012, John Kefalas, a Democratic member of the Colorado House of Representatives from the 52nd district, chose to run for a seat in the Colorado Senate from the 14th district. Ginal won the Democratic nomination without opposition and defeated Republican nominee Bob Morain in the general election. She defeated Republican nominee Donna Walter in the 2014, 2016, and 2018 elections.

Senator Kefalas was elected to a seat on the county commission in Larimer County during the 2018 election and resigned from the state senate to take the office. Ginal defeated Representative Jennifer Arndt, William Wright, and Michael Thomas in the vote conducted by the vacancy committee on December 16, 2018. Cathy Kipp, a member of the board of directors for the Poudre School district, was selected to replace Ginal in the state house. During the 2020 election she won the Democratic nomination and defeated Republican nominee Hans D. Hochheimer in the general election.

Tenure

During Ginal's tenure in the state house she served on the Health, Insurance and Environment, Transportation and Energy, and Public Health Care and Human Services committees. She served as chair of the Health, Insurance and Environment committee. She was a member of the LGBTQ Caucus in the state house. Ginal served on the Local Government, Agriculture and Natural Resources, and Health and Human Services committees in the state senate. She served as the chair of the Local Government and vice-chair of the Health and Human Services committee.

Political positions

In 2015, Ginal and Representative Lois Court introduced legislation to allow for terminally ill people with less than six months left to live to undergo euthanasia. She stated that she created the legislation because of Brittany Maynard, a brain cancer patient, who moved from California to Oregon to end her life. Their legislation failed in the state house, but Colorado Proposition 106, which allowed for assisted suicide, was passed with 64.9% of the popular vote in 2016.

Ginal introduced legislation in 2016, to make rolling coal a Class 2 misdemeanor traffic offense and the legislation was signed into law by Governor John Hickenlooper on June 5, 2017. Ginal was among thirty-seven legislators who endorsed a letter in 2018, calling for Planned Parenthood to allow for their workers to form an union. She sponsored legislation to allow people in Colorado to import prescription drugs from Canada. In 2019, she and Representative Alex Valdez were recognized as the best legislators by the Colorado Voters for Animals, an animal rights organization.

Electoral history

References

External links
 Ballotpedia: Joann Ginal
 Legislative website

Colorado State University alumni
Democratic Party members of the Colorado House of Representatives
LGBT state legislators in Colorado
Politicians from Fort Collins, Colorado
Iowa State University alumni
Lesbian politicians
Living people
Women state legislators in Colorado
University of New Hampshire alumni
21st-century American politicians
21st-century American women politicians
Year of birth missing (living people)
Democratic Party Colorado state senators